Asphodeline is a genus of perennial plants in the family Asphodelaceae, first described as a genus in 1830. It is native to the eastern Mediterranean region and the Middle East from Italy and Algeria east to Iran.

Asphodeline has fleshy roots and fragrant, starry flowers that are yellow in May to June. It grows up to 4 ft in well-drained soil. Its foliage is blue-green and grassy, with tall, narrow flower spikes. It takes at least three years before newly planted seedlings flower. The yellow flowers always make an interesting addition to the late-spring garden. The individual flowers on the spikes open in a seemingly random order, and do not last long, being replaced quickly by other flowers.

Species

 Asphodeline anatolica Tuzlaci - Turkey
 Asphodeline baytopiae Tuzlaci - Turkey, Syria
 Asphodeline brevicaulis (Bertol.) J.Gay ex Baker - from Greece to Iran
 Asphodeline cilicica Tuzlaci - Turkey
 Asphodeline damascena (Boiss.) Baker - Turkey, Syria
 Asphodeline globifera J.Gay ex Baker - Turkey, Syria
 Asphodeline liburnica (Scop.) Rchb. - Italy, southern Balkans, Aegean
 Asphodeline lutea (L.) Rchb. - from Albania to Turkey
 Asphodeline peshmeniana Tuzlaci - Turkey 
 Asphodeline prismatocarpa J.Gay ex Boiss. - Turkey 
 Asphodeline prolifera (M.Bieb.) Kunth - Caucasus, Iran, Turkey
 Asphodeline recurva Post - Turkey, Syria, Jordan
 Asphodeline rigidifolia (Boiss. & Heldr.) Baker - Turkey
 Asphodeline sertachiae Tuzlaci - Turkey
 Asphodeline taurica (Pall. ex M.Bieb.) Endl. - from Albania to Caucasus
 Asphodeline tenuior (Fisch. ex M.Bieb.) Ledeb. - Caucasus, Iran, Turkey
 Asphodeline turcica Tuzlaci - Turkey

References

Asphodeloideae
Taxa named by Ludwig Reichenbach